Matlock Bath railway station is a Grade II listed railway station owned by Network Rail and managed by East Midlands Railway. It is located in the village of Matlock Bath in Derbyshire, England.

History

Opened by the Manchester, Buxton, Matlock and Midland Junction Railway on 4 June 1849, the station closed on 6 March 1967, and reopened on 27 May 1972.

In recent times the usage of the station has increased; for example in the year 1 April 2009 to 31 March 2010 journeys increased by 62%.

The station buildings have an unusual 'chalet' style, inspired by the romantic notion at the time that the resort was England's Little Switzerland. The Heights of Abraham cable car runs from near the station up to the Heights of Abraham visitor attraction.

The station buildings have been occupied by Derbyshire Wildlife Trust since the 1980s and were restored in period-style and opened as a cafe/visitor centre in 2019 after a grant from the National Lottery Heritage Fund, with additional support from Derbyshire Dales and Derbyshire County councils, and other donations.

Stationmasters
David Ritchie ca. 1849 ca. 1853
Robert Skirrow ca. 1857 - 1860
W. Jordan 1860 - 1861
William Rich 1861 - ca. 1864
Charles Ward ca. 1870 - 1885
William Richardson 1885  - 1898 (afterwards station master at Buxton)
Albert C. Bilham 1898  - 1907 (formerly station master at Bakewell)
Frank Porter 1907 - ???? (formerly station master at Bakewell)
Henry Lovatt ca. 1911 - 1914
John Allen 1914 - 1923 
William Edward Parsons 1923 - 1931 (formerly station master at Duffield)
George White 1931 - 1947
William Rosling 1947 - 1968

Services
All services at Matlock Bath are operated by East Midlands Railway.

Saturdays also have an hourly service but all the trains originate or end in Derby.

On Sundays, there is a two-hourly service between Matlock and Nottingham in the morning, with services increasing to hourly from mid-afternoon onwards.

Services are formed using diesel multiple units of Classes 156, 158 or 170,

Public safety issues
In October 2015 Network Rail released CCTV footage showing members of the public taking selfie  photographs on the main crossing over the tracks at the station. Network Rail issued a safety warning asserting the railways were not for taking photographs on and that trains can appear without warning. Network Rail said it was releasing the footage to highlight the dangerous practices, particularly involving children on the railway line. The crossing has since been closed to the public.

See also
Listed buildings in Matlock Bath

References

External links

 National Railway Museum - Matlock Bath station, 1903
 Derwent Valley Line Community Rail Partnership
 Derwent Valley Line East Midlands Trains Community Rail Partnership

Grade II listed buildings in Derbyshire
Railway stations in Derbyshire
DfT Category F2 stations
Former Midland Railway stations
Railway stations in Great Britain opened in 1849
Railway stations in Great Britain closed in 1967
Railway stations in Great Britain opened in 1972
Reopened railway stations in Great Britain
Railway stations served by East Midlands Railway
Beeching closures in England
1849 establishments in England